Eucalyptus gypsophila, also known as the kopi mallee, is a species of mallee that is native to Western Australia and South Australia. It has rough, flaky bark on the lower part of the trunk, smooth light grey bark above, lance-shaped adult leaves, flower buds mostly in groups of between seven and eleven, creamy white flowers and conical to cylindrical fruit.

Description
Flowering occurs between July and December and the flowers are creamy white.

Taxonomy and naming
Eucalyptus gypsophila was first formally described in 1997 by the botanist Dean Nicolle in the journal Nuytsia. The specific epithet (gypsophila) is from the Greek gypsos meaning 'gypsum' and philos , 'loving', referring to this species commonly occurring on gypsum sand dunes around dry lakes.

This species was previously included in E. striaticalyx but that species is a tree.

This mallee belongs in subgenus Symphyomyrtus section Dumaria, to a large sub-group, series Rufispermae, composed of 37 described species and subspecies including E. kondininensis, E. striaticalyx and E. repullulans.

Distribution
Kopi mallee is widespread in the Great Victoria Desert, from east of Laverton in Western Australia to the western edge of the Gawler Ranges in South Australia. Over most of its range it grows on red sand over limestone, often near salt lakes or dry lakes.

See also
List of Eucalyptus species

References

gypsophila
Flora of South Australia
Mallees (habit)
Myrtales of Australia
Eucalypts of Western Australia
Plants described in 1997